William Learned Marcy (December 12, 1786July 4, 1857) was an American lawyer, politician, and judge who served as U.S. Senator, Governor of New York, U.S. Secretary of War and U.S. Secretary of State. In the latter office, he negotiated the Gadsden Purchase, the last major acquisition of land in the contiguous United States.

Born in Southbridge Massachusetts, Marcy established a legal practice in Troy, New York after graduating from Brown University. He fought in the War of 1812, as an ensign, first lieutenant and captain in the 155th New York Infantry Regiment. Politically, he aligned with the Bucktail faction of the Democratic-Republican Party and became a leading member of the Albany Regency. As the Democratic-Republicans fractured in the 1820s, he became a member of the Democratic Party. Between 1821 and 1831, he successively served as Adjutant General of New York, New York State Comptroller, and as an associate justice of the New York Supreme Court. In 1831, the New York legislature elected Marcy to the U.S. Senate, and he held that position until 1833, when he became the Governor of New York. He served three terms as governor until his defeat in 1838 by the Whig nominee, William Seward.

He served as Secretary of War under James K. Polk from 1845 to 1849, overseeing the Mexican–American War. After leaving the Polk administration, he resumed the practice of law and became a leader of the "Soft" Hunker faction of the New York Democratic Party. He returned to the Cabinet in 1853, serving as Secretary of State under Franklin Pierce. In this role, he resolved a dispute about the status of U.S. immigrants abroad and directed U.S. diplomats to dress in the plain style of an ordinary American rather than the court-dress many had adopted from Europe. He also negotiated a reciprocity treaty with British North America and the Gadsden purchase with Mexico, acquiring territory in present-day Arizona and New Mexico. He left office in 1857 and died shortly thereafter.

Early life
William Learned Marcy was born in what is now Southbridge, Massachusetts, the son of farmer Jedediah Marcy and Ruth (Learned) Marcy. He attended schools in Leicester and graduated from The Woodstock Academy in Woodstock, Connecticut, before enrolling at Brown University, from which he graduated in 1808. After receiving his degree, Marcy, taught school in Dedham, Massachusetts and Newport, Rhode Island. He studied law with Troy, New York attorney William L. Bliss, was admitted to the bar in 1811, and began a practice in Troy. Marcy served in the militia during the War of 1812, first as an ensign in the 155th New York Infantry Regiment, and later advancing through the ranks to first lieutenant and captain. On October 22, 1812, he took part in the storming of the British post at St. Regis, Canada. He remained with the regiment after the war and attained the rank of lieutenant colonel as its second in command.

Afterward he served as Troy City Recorder from 1816 to 1818 and 1821 to 1823. As he sided with the Anti-Dewitt Clinton faction of the Democratic-Republican Party, known as the Bucktails, he was removed from office in 1818 after Clinton was elected governor. He was the editor of the Troy Budget newspaper.

In 1812, Marcy married Dolly Newell of Southbridge, who died in 1821. On April 28, 1824, he married Cornelia Knower (1801–1889, daughter of Benjamin Knower) at the Knower House in Guilderland, New York. They had three children—Samuel (1820–1862), Edmund (1832–1853), and Cornelia (1834–1888). Samuel Marcy was a United States Navy officer who was killed on board the USS Vincennes during the American Civil War. Edmund was ill when he died on board the USS Preble while going to the Azores in the hopes of regaining his health. Cornelia Marcy was the wife of Edmund Henry Pendleton (1845–1910), a Union Army veteran who later became a successful author.

State politics

Marcy became the leading member of the Albany Regency, a group of Democratic politicians who controlled State politics between 1821 and 1838. He was Adjutant General of New York with the rank of brigadier general from 1821 to 1823, New York State Comptroller from 1823 to 1829, and an associate justice of the New York Supreme Court from 1829 to 1831.

In 1831, he was elected U.S. Senator from New York by the state legislature as a Jacksonian Democrat, and served from March 4, 1831, to January 1, 1833. He resigned upon taking office as governor, to which position he was elected in 1832. He sat on the U.S. Senate Committee on the Judiciary in the 22nd Congress. Defending Jackson's nomination of Martin Van Buren as minister to the United Kingdom in 1832, Marcy used the phrase "'to the victor belong the spoils," from which the term spoils system is derived to refer to patronage political appointments.
 
Marcy was elected as Governor of New York for three terms, from 1833 until 1838. As governor he checked the issue of bank charters by the legislature and secured the enactment, in 1838, of a general banking law, which abolished the monopoly features that resulted from the old banking system. In 1838, he was defeated by Whig William H. Seward, which led to a radical change in state politics and then ended the Regency. To the abolitionists who questioned the candidates for governor, Marcy was considered a "doughface," a man with Southern sympathies. He was well aware of the importance of Southern cotton and trade for New York state, both as a major part of exports from New York City and to the textile mills of upstate that processed cotton from the Deep South.

Marcy was appointed as a member of the Mexican Claims Commission, serving from 1839 to 1842. Later he was recognized as one of the leaders of the Hunkers, the conservative, office-seeking, and pro-compromise-on-slavery faction of the Democratic Party in New York.

Federal politics
Marcy served as United States Secretary of War in the Cabinet of President James K. Polk from 1845 until 1849, when he resumed the practice of law in New York. After 1849, Marcy led the "Soft" faction of the Hunkers that supported reconciliation with the Barnburners. He sought the Democratic presidential nomination in 1852 but was unsuccessful, in part by "Hard" opposition led by Daniel S. Dickinson.

Secretary of State
Marcy returned to public life in 1853 to serve as United States Secretary of State under President Franklin Pierce. On June 1 of that year, he issued a circular to American diplomatic agents abroad, recommending that whenever practicable, they should appear in the simple dress of an American citizen. This directive created much discussion in Europe, where diplomats typically wore court dress. In 1867, Marcy's recommendation was enacted into law by the US Congress.

Marcy resolved the Koszta Affair (1853), related to detention of an unnaturalized American resident by Austria, gaining his freedom. He negotiated the Gadsden Purchase from Mexico in the Southwest, the last major land acquisition in the contiguous United States. It added land to what are now the states of New Mexico and Arizona. With a southern route of territory all under United States control, southerners worked to promote a railroad from Texas to San Diego but were not successful.

In 1854 Marcy had to deal with the complications growing out of the bombardment of Greytown (now San Juan de Nicaragua), by the United States warship Cyane in retaliation for insults offered the American minister by its inhabitants and for their refusal to make restitution for damages to American property. The expedition of William Walker to Nicaragua, and his assumption of its Presidency, in 1855, further complicated the Central American question.

Upon the 1854 seizure by Spain of the American vessel Black Warrior, on the ground that this vessel had violated the customs regulations of the port of Havana, some propagandists in the United States Congress as well as Pierre Soulé, the American minister in Spain, seemed to prefer war and make possible the seizure of Cuba. It was largely due to Marcy's influence that war was averted, Spain restored the confiscated cargo, paid restitution, and remitted the captain's fine. Three American diplomats met to discuss the future of Cuba, but the resulting Ostend Manifesto was quite unexpected, and Marcy promptly disavowed the document.

The Crimean War led to a diplomatic controversy with Great Britain because of British recruiting in several American cities, and in May 1856, the papers of the British representative Sir John Crampton and several consuls were revoked. The following year the British government sent Sir Francis Napier to Washington to take Crampton's place. A diplomatic disagreement with Britain caused Marcy to reject the Declaration of Paris of 1856, which would have set the rules of international maritime law.

Other affairs that demanded Marcy's attention were a Canadian tariff reciprocity treaty, Commodore Matthew C. Perry's negotiations for naval and trade access with Japan, and a British fishery dispute.

Death
Marcy died at Ballston Spa, New York, on July 4, 1857. He was buried at the Rural Cemetery in Albany, New York.

Legacy and honors

The United States Revenue Cutter , launched in 1853, was named in his honor.
His portrait appeared on American paper currency, the U.S. $1000 Silver Certificate, issued between 1878 and 1891.
 Marcy Street in his hometown Southbridge, Massachusetts was named for him. He was also born on this street on the corner of Main Street and Marcy Street which is now the site of the St. John Paul II Parish.
Mount Marcy in Essex County, at 1629 meters, the highest peak in New York, was named for him.
The Town of Marcy in Oneida County was named for him.
The Marcy Projects, public housing in Brooklyn, New York, were named for him.
Marcy School in Minneapolis, was named for him. When Minneapolis neighborhoods were later named for their schools, the Marcy-Holmes neighborhood honored Marcy School and Holmes School.

References

Further reading
 Spencer, Ivor Debenham, The Victor and the Spoils: A Life of William L. Marcy, Brown University Press (1959).

Sources

External links

|-

|-

|-

|-

|-

1786 births
1857 deaths
United States Secretaries of State
United States Secretaries of War
Candidates in the 1852 United States presidential election
Democratic Party governors of New York (state)
New York Supreme Court Justices
Brown University alumni
American militiamen in the War of 1812
People from Southbridge, Massachusetts
Burials at Albany Rural Cemetery
New York State Comptrollers
Polk administration cabinet members
New York (state) Jacksonians
19th-century American politicians
New York (state) Democratic-Republicans
Democratic Party United States senators from New York (state)
Pierce administration cabinet members
Adjutants General of New York (state)